Bangor Episcopal Church is a historic Episcopal church complex located at Churchtown, in Caernarvon Township, Lancaster County, Pennsylvania. The church was built in 1830, and is a 1 1/2-story, brownstone rectangular building in the Gothic Revival style.  It has a steep, slate covered gable roof and steeple added about 1880.  It features Gothic arch art glass windows.  The complex includes the frame school building.  It is a one-story, three bay building built in 1844 in the Greek Revival style.  Also on the property is a contributing cemetery with approximately 325 graves dated from the Revolutionary War to the present.

It was listed on the National Register of Historic Places in 1978.

References

External links

Bangor Episcopal Church, Churchtown, Pennsylvania – This Old Church on Waymarking.com

Cemeteries in Lancaster County, Pennsylvania
Churches on the National Register of Historic Places in Pennsylvania
Gothic Revival church buildings in Pennsylvania
Greek Revival church buildings in Pennsylvania
Churches completed in 1830
19th-century Episcopal church buildings
Churches in Lancaster County, Pennsylvania
Episcopal churches in Pennsylvania
1830 establishments in Pennsylvania
Historic districts on the National Register of Historic Places in Pennsylvania
National Register of Historic Places in Lancaster County, Pennsylvania